Oreodera basicretata is a species of beetle in the family Cerambycidae. It was described by Neouze and Tavakilian in 2010.

References

Oreodera
Beetles described in 2010